"Foodland" (Full name Foodland Super Market, Ltd.) is an American supermarket chain, headquartered in Honolulu, Hawaii. Foodland operates 32 stores throughout the state of Hawaii under the "Foodland," "Foodland Farms," and "Sack 'N Save" names. "Food, Family, Friends & Aloha" is their current slogan. The chain is in the process of adding more locations in Hawaii. The chain serves as the flagship of the Sullivan Family of Companies.

History
The chain opened its first store in Honolulu's Market City in 1948. The founder, Maurice J. "Sully" Sullivan came from Ireland to Hawaii and opened a supermarket called Foodland.  By 1967 it had expanded statewide. They are the largest locally-owned supermarket chain in Hawaii as well as the oldest. It competes with another Honolulu-based supermarket chain with locations statewide, Times Supermarkets, and national chains Safeway, Costco, Don Quijote, and Walmart. The current chairman and CEO of Foodland Super Market is Jenai S. Wall.

The "FoodLand" name
"FoodLand" is also the name of at least three regional supermarket chains in the United States. The other two are in the western Pennsylvania/West Virginia area, where a different, unrelated FoodLand has stores. An undetermined number of stores located  particularly in Alabama, share the same logo as the Pennsylvania-based chain, but appear to be otherwise separate.

The name "Foodland," being fairly generic and apparently not a registered trademark, appears as all or part of the name of countless unaffiliated grocery stores throughout the country, as well as in Australia, Canada, Iceland and Thailand.

References

External links
 FoodLand (Hawaii) website

Supermarkets of the United States
Companies based in Hawaii
1948 establishments in Hawaii
Retail companies established in 1948
Grocery stores in Hawaii
American companies established in 1948
Retail companies based in Hawaii